Charles Barwig (March 19, 1837February 15, 1912) was a German American immigrant, businessman, and Democratic politician.  He served three terms in the United States House of Representatives, representing the east-central part of Wisconsin.

Biography

Born in Hesse-Darmstadt in the German Confederation, Barwig immigrated to the United States in 1845 with his parents, who settled in Milwaukee, Wisconsin Territory. He attended the public schools and graduated from the Spencerian Business College in Milwaukee in 1857.

He moved to Mayville, Wisconsin, in 1865 and engaged in the wholesale liquor business. He served as mayor of Mayville from 1886 until 1888.

Barwig was elected as a Democrat to the Fifty-first, Fifty-second, and Fifty-third Congresses (March 4, 1889March 3, 1895) as the representative of Wisconsin's 2nd congressional district.  He served as chairman of the Committee on Expenditures in the Department of the Treasury (Fifty-third Congress).  He was an unsuccessful candidate for reelection in 1894 to the Fifty-fourth Congress.

He engaged in the real estate business.

He died in Mayville, Wisconsin, on February 15, 1912, and was interred in Mayville's Graceland Cemetery.

Barwig's son, Byron Barwig, also served as mayor of Mayville and was elected to the Wisconsin State Senate.

Sources

1837 births
1912 deaths
People from Mayville, Wisconsin
Businesspeople from Wisconsin
Mayors of places in Wisconsin
Democratic Party members of the United States House of Representatives from Wisconsin
19th-century American politicians
19th-century American businesspeople